Joseph Alphonse Albert Cadotte (January 3, 1891 – August 10, 1918) was a Canadian professional ice hockey player. He played with the Montreal Wanderers of the National Hockey Association. He appeared in 6 games for the Wanderers in the 1912–13 season. On August 10, 1918, Cadotte was killed in action in the Battle of Amiens.

References

External links
Bert Cadotte at JustSportsStats

1891 births
1918 deaths
Canadian ice hockey goaltenders
Canadian military personnel killed in World War I
Ice hockey people from Montreal
Montreal Wanderers (NHA) players
Military personnel from Montreal